Karl O'Connell is a Gaelic footballer who plays at senior level for the Monaghan county team.

On 25 October 2017, O'Connell was named in the Ireland squad for the 2017 International Rules Series against Australia in November.

References

1988 births
Living people
Irish international rules football players
Monaghan inter-county Gaelic footballers